The Bar Region, or the Bars, is an area in central Punjab, now part of the Punjab Province of Pakistan. The area consists of agricultural land that was cleared in the nineteenth century for the then 'new' canal irrigation system that the  British were developing at the time. The soil of the Bar Region is fertile. The plains of fertile land have been created by the stream deposits driven by the many rivers flowing from the Himalayas.

The area stretches from the river Sutlej to the river Chenab and down to the junction of two rivers Jehlum and Chenab. The word bar in Punjabi language refers to a threshold, an outer space, an area away from the human settlement, a barrier between populated area and wild forest, a natural jungle. So the area between two rivers that formed a natural barrier between two different settlements was called bar. All the 'Bar Regions' had and still have almost the same or similar culture and language or dialect with slight variations.

The 'Bar' is further divided into five regions: 

The Sandal Bar (the area between the Ravi and Chenab rivers). The great Punjabi folk tales or epic love stories like those of Heer Ranjha and Mirza Sahiban happened in the Sandal Bar. Sandal Bar also was home to Dulla Bhatti who rebelled and fought against the centralised scheme of agricultural revenue collection (Lagaan) of Mughal emperor Akbar

Kirana Bar (the area between the western side of Chenab River and the eastern side of Jehlum rivers)
Neeli Bar (the area between the Ravi and Sutlej rivers) 
Ganji Bar (the area between the Sutlej and dry river bed of the Hakra also called the Ravi River). Ganji Bar was also home to Rai Ahmad Khan Kharal    (1785–1857), a Punjabi freedom activist and folk hero, who fought against the British Raj in the Indian Rebellion of 1857.

 The Gondal Bar (The area of kirana bar between jehlum and chenab rivers which includes some area of the district gujrat and all district Mandibahaudin and some parts of sargodha district (bhalwal tehsil) '''

Most of the  Bar now forms part of the modern Faisalabad, Jhang, Tob Tek Singh, Hafizabad District, Okara, Vehari, Khanewal, Pakpattan, Sargodha, Chiniot, Hafizabad, Nankana Sahib, Bahawalnagar, Mandi Bahauddin and Sahiwal districts of the Punjab province in Pakistan. The Indigenous people of these districts have similar culture and speak Jatki/Jangli dialect of Punjabi.

See also
Baar di boli
Doab

References

Punjab
Historical regions of Pakistan